is a Japanese professional baseball pitcher for the Fukuoka SoftBank Hawks in Japan's Nippon Professional Baseball.

Professional career
On October 27, 2011, Takeda was drafted by the Fukuoka SoftBank Hawks as their first overall pick in the 2011 Nippon Professional Baseball draft.

2012–2015 season

On July 7, 2012, Takeda pitched his debut game against the Hokkaido Nippon-Ham Fighters as a starting pitcher, and won the game for the first time in the Pacific League.
 He finished the 2012 season with 11 Games pitched, a 8–1 Win–loss record, a 1.07 ERA, a 67 strikeouts in 67 innings. On November 20, he was honored with the 2012 Pacific League Excellent rookie award.

In 2013, Takeda finished the regular season with a 17 Games pitched, a 4–4 Win–loss record, a 3.48 ERA, a 56 strikeouts in 93 innings.

In 2014, Takeda developed pain in the right shoulder during spring camp and spent half a year in rehabilitation. On August 6, he made a comeback and pitched against the Saitama Seibu Lions. He finished the regular season with a 7 Games pitched, a 3–3 Win–loss record, a 1.87 ERA, a 43 strikeouts in  innings. On October 26, he pitched against the Hanshin Tigers as a starting pitcher, and won the game for the first time in the Japan Series. And he was honored with the 2014 Japan Series Excellent Player Award.

On November 7, Takeda was selected as the Japan national baseball team for 2014 MLB Japan All-Star Series. And on November 20, he pitched against the MLB All-Stars as a starting pitcher, and won the game for the first time in the MLB Japan All-Star Series.

In 2015, Takeda finished the regular season with a 25 Games pitched, a 13–6 Win–loss record, a 3.17 ERA, a 163 strikeouts in  innings. On October 24, he pitched against the Tokyo Yakult Swallows as a starting pitcher, and won the game in the 2015 Japan Series. And he was honored with the 2015 Japan Series Excellent Player Award.

2016–2020 season
In 2016, Takeda finished the regular season with 27 Games pitched, a 14–8 Win–loss record, a 2.95 ERA, a 144 strikeouts in 183 innings.

On February 4, 2017, Takeda was selected as the Japan national baseball team for 2017 World Baseball Classic. On April 14, he developed inflammation of the right shoulder and spent rehabilitation until summer. He finished the 2017 season with 13 Games pitched, a 6–4 Win–loss record, a 3.68 ERA, a 60 strikeouts in 71 innings. On October 31, he pitched against the Yokohama DeNA BayStars as a starting pitcher in the 2017 Japan Series.

In 2018, Takeda finished the regular season with 27 Games pitched, a 4–9 Win–loss record, a 4.48 ERA, a one Saves, a 87 strikeouts in  innings. And he pitched as a relief pitcher against the Hiroshima Toyo Carp in the 2018 Japan Series.

In 2019, Takeda finished the regular season with 32 Games pitched, a 5–3 Win–loss record, a 4.55 ERA, a one Saves, a 9 Holds, a 70 strikeouts in 83 innings. And he was selected as the Japan Series roster in the 2019 Japan Series.

In 2020, Takeda finished the regular season with 7 Games pitched, a 2–2 Win–loss record, a 6.48 ERA, a 23 strikeouts in 25 innings. In the 2020 Japan Series against the Yomiuri Giants, he was selected as the Japan Series roster.

2021 season–present
In 2021 season, Takeda was pitching as a starting pitcher from the start of the season, but he developed tenosynovitis in his right hand in an interleague game and spent the season in rehabilitation. he recorded with a 12 Games pitched, a 4–5 Win–loss record, a 2.68 ERA, and a 73 strikeouts in 77.1 innings.

In 2022 season, he delayed his comeback in July with enthesitis of the latissimus dorsi muscle, and spent time in rehabilitation in August with inflammation of the ligaments in his right elbow. he finished the regular season with a 10 Games pitched, a 2–1 Win–loss record, a 2.57 ERA, and a 34 strikeouts in 28 innings.

International career
On October 9, Takeda was selected as the Japan national baseball team for 2015 WBSC Premier12.

February 2, 2017, Takeda was elected to the Japan national baseball team at the 2017 World Baseball Classic.

References

External links

Career statistics - NPB.jp
18 Shota Takeda PLAYERS2022 - Fukuoka SoftBank Hawks Official site

1993 births
Living people
Baseball people from Miyazaki Prefecture
Japanese baseball players
Nippon Professional Baseball pitchers
Fukuoka SoftBank Hawks players
2015 WBSC Premier12 players
2017 World Baseball Classic players